This is the results breakdown of the local elections held in the Valencian Community on 24 May 2015. The following tables show detailed results in the autonomous community's most populous municipalities, sorted alphabetically.

Opinion polls

Overall

City control
The following table lists party control in the most populous municipalities, including provincial capitals (shown in bold). Gains for a party are displayed with the cell's background shaded in that party's colour.

Municipalities

Alcoy
Population: 59,675

Alicante
Population: 332,067

Benidorm
Population: 69,010

Castellón de la Plana
Population: 173,841

Elche
Population: 228,647

Elda
Population: 53,540

Gandia
Population: 76,497

Orihuela
Population: 83,417

Paterna
Population: 67,156

Sagunto
Population: 65,003

Torrent
Population: 80,551

Torrevieja
Population: 91,415

Valencia

Population: 786,424

Xàtiva
Population: 29,361

See also
2015 Valencian regional election

References

Valencian Community
2015